Cole Creek is a stream in northern Gasconade County in the U.S. state of Missouri. It is a tributary of the Missouri River.

The stream flows to the northeast for about two miles roughly parallel to the Missouri. It then turns north to its confluence with the Missouri at  two miles west of Hermann.

The namesake of Cole Creek is unknown.

See also
List of rivers of Missouri

References

Rivers of Gasconade County, Missouri
Rivers of Missouri